was a Japanese samurai of the Azuchi-Momoyama period through early Edo period. He served the Maeda clan of Kaga as one of its senior retainers. He married Ko, daughter of Maeda Toshiie.

His court title was Tsushima no kami.

References
Kita, Sandy (1999). The Last Tosa: Iwasa Katsumochi Matabei, Bridge to Ukiyo-e. (Honolulu: University of Hawai'i Press), p. 152.

Samurai
Maeda clan
Kaga-Maeda retainers
1550 births
1631 deaths